Kaarlo Aleksanteri (Santeri) Haapanen (23 December 1877 - 25 April 1957) was a Finnish schoolteacher and farmer, born in Puolanka. He was a member of the Parliament of Finland, representing the Finnish Party from 1909 to 1911 and the Agrarian League from 1916 to 1919.

References

1877 births
1957 deaths
People from Puolanka
People from Oulu Province (Grand Duchy of Finland)
Finnish Lutherans
Finnish Party politicians
Centre Party (Finland) politicians
Members of the Parliament of Finland (1909–10)
Members of the Parliament of Finland (1910–11)
Members of the Parliament of Finland (1916–17)
Members of the Parliament of Finland (1917–19)
People of the Finnish Civil War (White side)
Finnish schoolteachers